James H. Leary (June 4, 1946 — March 22, 2021) was an American double bass player and arranger/composer. Among his notable teachers and mentors was Ortiz Walton, the youngest member to sign with the Boston Symphony and its first African America member.Double bass under who played with the Count Basie Orchestra, Nancy Wilson, Earl Hines, Bobby Hutcherson, Eddie Harris, Dizzy Gillespie with the San Francisco Pops conducted by Arthur Fiedler, Max Roach, Eddie Cleanhead Vinson, Rahsaan Roland Kirk, Johnny Hartman, Major Lance, Johnny Taylor, Esther Phillips, Rosemary Clooney, and Don Shirley. His involvement with Broadway shows included Eubie!, They're Playing Our Song, Ain't Misbehavin', Bubbling Brown Sugar, Five Guys Named Moe, Timbuktu! with Eartha Kitt, Oakland Symphony Bass Section, Pharoah Sanders, Red Garland, Jaki Byard, Randy Weston, and John Handy.

Leary was born in Little Rock, Arkansas, United States, and studied at the University of Arkansas at Pine Bluff. He has won two Grammy Awards.

Discography

With Bobby Hutcherson
Waiting (Blue Note, 1976)
With Eddie Harris
Sounds Incredible (Angelaco, 1980)
With Earl Hines
Hines '74 (Black & Blue, 1974)
The Dirty Old Men (Black & Blue, 1974) with Budd Johnson
Earl Hines at Sundown (Black & Blue, 1974)

References

External links
All About Jazz entry

1946 births
Living people
American double-bassists
Male double-bassists
American music arrangers
University of Arkansas at Pine Bluff alumni
Musicians from Little Rock, Arkansas
Grammy Award winners
Count Basie Orchestra members
21st-century double-bassists